The 2009 Australian Drivers' Championship was a CAMS sanctioned national motor racing title with the championship winner receiving the 2009 CAMS Gold Star award. The 2009 championship was the 53rd Australian Drivers' Championship and the fifth to be contested with open wheel racing cars constructed in accordance with FIA Formula 3 regulations.  The season began on 19 March 2009 at the Adelaide Street Circuit and finished on 29 November at Sandown Raceway after eight events across four different states with two rounds per event. Team BRM driver Joey Foster became the second successive champion from Great Britain, holding off 2007 series champion Tim Macrow by eight points. In the National classes, Tom Tweedie was champion in National A, recording three top-three overall finishes and twelve class wins, while Peter Kalpakiotis was champion in National B as he was the only driver to contest more than one meeting.

Class structure
Drivers compete in three classes:
 Australian Formula 3 Championship – for cars constructed in accordance with the FIA Formula 3 regulations that applied between 1 January 2002 and 31 December 2007
 Formula 3 National A – for cars constructed in accordance with the FIA Formula 3 regulations that applied between 1 January 2002 and 31 December 2004
 Formula 3 National B –  for cars constructed in accordance with the FIA Formula 3 regulations that applied between 1 January 1999 and 31 December 2001

Points System
Championship points were awarded on a 20–15–12–10–8–6–4–3–2–1 basis to the top ten classified finishers in the Championship Class in each race. One additional point was awarded to the driver setting the fastest lap time in the class in each qualifying session and in each race at each round. The same system was also used for both the National A Class and the National B Class awards.

Teams and drivers
The following teams and drivers have competed during the 2009 Australian Formula 3 season.

Race calendar
Originally Event 7 of the series was to have taken place at Symmons Plains Raceway in Tasmania, and was indeed set to host the series signature race, the Tasmanian Super Prix on 18 October, however with several other series involved in the Shannons Nationals Motor Racing Championships withdrawing from the logistically difficult Tasmanian meeting, the event was cancelled. Subsequently, a new meeting was organised to be held at Queensland Raceway on 21 August on the support card of the V8 Supercar Championship Series.

Results and standings

Drivers Championship

See also
 Australian Drivers' Championship
 Australian Formula 3

References

External links
 Official Australian Formula 3 website
 2009 Racing Results Archive

Australian Drivers' Championship
Drivers' Championship
Australian Formula 3 seasons
Australia
Australian Formula 3